= Obri, Konjic =

Village in Bosnia and Herzegovina

Obri
- Village
- Location within Bosnia and Herzegovina
- Country: Bosnia and Herzegovina
- Entity: Federation of Bosnia and Herzegovina
- Canton: Herzegovina-Neretva
- Municipality: Konjic

Area
  - Total: 1.44 sq mi (3.74 km^{2})

Population (2013)
  - Total: 53
  - Density: 37/sq mi (14/km^{2})
- Time zone: UTC+1 (CET)
  - Summer (DST): UTC+2 (CEST)

Obri is a village in the municipality of Konjic, Bosnia and Herzegovina.

== Demographics ==
According to the 2013 census, its population was 53.

Ethnicity in 2013
Ethnicity	Number	Percentage
Bosniaks	51	96.2%
Croats	1	1.9%
Serbs	1	1.9%
Total	53	100%
